A Cappella is an album from Contemporary Christian, Southern Gospel group Gaither Vocal Band. The album was released on September 30, 2003.

Track listing

"Low Down the Chariot" (Bill Gaither, Russ Taff) – 2:52
"Leave It There" / "What a Friend We Have in Jesus" (C. C. Converse, Joseph Scriven, Charles Albert Tindley) – 4:27
"When I Survey the Wondrous Cross" (Isaac Watts) – 3:24
"Delivered from the Hands of Pharaoh" (O. A. Parris, Eugene Wright) – 2:27
"He Will Carry You" (Scott Wesley Brown) – 4:45
"Jesus! What a Friend for Sinners" (John Wilbur Chapman, Rowland Prichard) – 4:17
"Sing a Song"/"I'd Like to Teach the World to Sing (In Perfect Harmony)" (Bill Backer, Roger Cook, Billy Davis, Roger Greenaway, Joe Raposo) – 3:41
"Center of My Joy" (Bill Gaither, Gloria Gaither, Richard Smallwood) – 4:24
"Heaven's Joy Awaits" (V. B. Ellis) – 2:38
"God Bless America" (Irving Berlin) – 3:28
"I Then Shall Live" (Gloria Gaither, Jean Sibelius) – 5:13
"Gentle Shepherd" (Gloria Gaither, Bill Gaither) – 4:11

Awards

On 2004, A Cappella was nominated for two Dove Awards: Southern Gospel Album of the Year and Southern Gospel Recorded Song of the Year for "Gentle Shepherd", at the 35th GMA Dove Awards.

Chart performance

The album peaked at #174 on the Billboard 200 and #7 on Billboard's Christian Albums.

References

External links
A Cappella on Amazon

2003 albums
Gaither Vocal Band albums